The Night of Wishes: Or the Satanarchaeolidealcohellish Notion Potion is a German Fantasy book by the German children's book author Michael Ende that was first published in 1989 and awarded with the Swiss literary award "La vache qui lit" in 1990. The original German title was Der satanarchäolügenialkohöllische Wunschpunsch.

Plot 
The evil sorcerer Beelzebub Preposteror has contracted with His Excellency, the Minister of Pitch Darkness, to perform a certain number of evil deeds each year. This year, however, he did not meet the requirement because the High Council of the Animals has sent the cat Maurizio as a spy, which forces Beelzebub to be more cautious. He is threatened with a "seizure" by Maledictus T. Maggot, an official of the devil, should he not fulfill his quota of evil deeds until midnight.

On New Year's Eve (called, not unimportantly for the plot, St. Sylvester's Day in Germany) he joins forces with the evil witch Tyrannia Vampirella, who has the same problem due to the raven Jacob who is spying on her. Together they try to brew the eponymous Notion Potion that will grant them all wishes, in order to fulfill their part of the contract before midnight. If they succeeded to brew the potion they wouldn't even have to keep it secret from the animals, because due to the nature of the potion every wish they make will have the exact opposite effect - i.e. if they wish someone good health, he'll become sick instead.

The plot starts on New Year's Eve at 5 pm and the chapters each represent one hour until midnight to illustrate the increasing time pressure that the characters are under. On the one hand, the sorcerers have to complete a five-meter-long recipe to brew the potion, while constantly getting in each other's way. On the other, the cat and the raven must find a way to stop their evil plan while tackling their own problems, namely the obesity of the cat and the chronic diseases of the raven. As the animals, in their search for help, arrive in the city near the cathedral, Jacob remembers a weakness of the potion: if the potion has not been fully drunk up before the first ring of the bell at midnight, the potion won't reverse the meaning of the wishes - as expected by the two sorcerers - but instead grants them as wished.

So they need such a bell tone. After the first enthusiasm, however, Jacob soon realizes the impossibility of this idea since that tone can only come from the real New Year's chime exactly at midnight. Maurizio is nevertheless thrilled by this unexpected glimmer of hope and ignores all of Jacob's objections and warnings. Since the cathedral tower is locked, Mauricio climbs up the icy tower from outside in darkness and storms. Jacob reluctantly follows him because he is worried about his friend's wellbeing. With the last of their strength, they reach the belfry where they pass out. When they wake up, they are surprised to find themselves facing Pope Sylvester I, who, as every year, has appeared from the hereafter to ring the bells. Although the bells will only ring at midnight, the Pope is able to give the animals a frozen sound of the midnight chime prematurely since space and time play no role for him as a saint. So, as a last challenge, the animals have to put this tone into the potion without the magicians noticing.

Thanks to the saint, who enables them to fly back to the Villa Nightmare at the speed of sound, they just manage to do this. The magicians begin their intended work and wish the world all the best with every sip from the wishing punch, assuming the reversal effect of the potion will cause the world harm. The punch is also strongly alcoholic, so by the time midnight comes along, they're both heavily inebriated, and decide to take their drunken ire out on their pets. After wishing them health - to cause the opposite - the two animals heal up completely, and their lifetime wishes are fulfilled. The magicians are stunned, but are too drunk to understand what had happened. While the raven and the cat flee from the house, the drunken magicians now try to curse each other by means of the wishing punch, but this fails completely. When a few seconds before midnight they finally realize what is going on, it is already too late: Seeing the punch has been all used up, they pass out drunk.

While His Hellish Excellency has Maledictus T. Maggot impound the magicians' souls after midnight, the raven and the tomcat are outside and enthusiastically plan their future while they watch the sky as the world turns into a bright future.

Characters 

Note: Unless otherwise stated, the information on the figures refers to the hardcover edition published by Thienemann-Esslinger Verlag, 12th edition 2016.
 The evil sorcerer Beelzebub Preposteror (Beelzebub Irrwitzer) is 187 years old and thus relatively young for his peers. According to the description in the first chapter, he is a tall and gaunt-looking man. He wears a silk dressing gown in his favorite color poison green. He is bald and has protruding ears, a hooked nose and a thin-lipped mouth that is shriveled "like a sun-dried apple." He wears black frame coke-bottle glasses. The magician is named after his patron, the devil Beelzebub, the minister of pitch darkness.   
 The money witch Tyrannia Vampirella (Aunt Tyti, Tyrannja Vamperl) is almost 300 years old, but "still very active in her profession.”. According to the description in the chapters 6:35 pm and 6:40 pm, it is "literally as wide as she is tall. She wears a sulfur-yellow evening dress with black stripes. She wears an enormous amount of jewelry and her visibly aged "pug face” is heavily made-up. Instead of a handbag, she carries a small safe with her. Her patron is Mammon, the Infernal Minister of Finance.
 The young three-colored tomcat Mauricio di Mauro (Maurizio di Mauro) is a spy of the "High Council of Animals". During his time with Preposteror, he has become spherical and lethargic and has neglected his mission. He initially let himself be deceived and thinks of Preposteror as a "benefactor of the animals". Although he is just an ordinary street cat, he dreams of being a singer from an old noble Neapolitan family.
 The old pessimistic raven Jacob Scribble (Jakob Krakel) is also a spy of the "High Council of the Animals", namely of Tyrannia Vampirella. In his first appearance in the chapter 6:05 pm, he appears quite battered like a big potato "... in which someone has stuck a few black feathers." He enlightens Maurizio about the true nature of Preposteror.
 According to the description in chapter 5:11 pm, Maledictus T. Maggot (Maledictus Made) is an official of the devil. He is dressed in black and wears a coat, hat and gloves. His face is pale, his eyes are colorless and he has no eyelids.
 Every year the statue of Pope Sylvester I (Silvester I.) comes to life on its name day to ring the cathedral bells at midnight. According to the description in chapter 5:45 pm, he is a thin-boned old man who wears an embroidered gold coat with a bishop's miter and crozier. He has bushy white eyebrows and his eyes are water blue.

Title

The word satanarchäolügenialkohöllisch is a portmanteau from the German words Satan, Anarchie, Archäologie, Lüge, genial, Alkohol and höllisch (Satan, anarchy, archeology, lie, ingenious, alcohol and infernal).
The English word Satanarchaeolidealcohellish is a similar portmanteau of the words Satan, anarchy, archaeology, lie, ideal, alcohol and hellish.

Adaptations
 Wunschpunsch (2000-2002), animated series directed by Philippe Amador

Literature 
 Der satanarchäolügenialkohöllische Wunschpunsch. Thienemann Verlag, Stuttgart 1989,

References

External links 
 Official website of Michael Ende
 

1989 fantasy novels
German children's novels
German fantasy novels
Novels by Michael Ende
1989 children's books
1989 German novels
Books about cats